Vígľaš is a village and municipality in Detva District, in the Banská Bystrica Region of central Slovakia.

Etymology
The name is of Hungarian origin: vég les (Weegles 1395), free translation "at the end", "a tree stand at the edge". The name was motivated by a royal hunting ground.

Climate
Lowest ever temperature recorded in Slovakia was recorded in Vígľaš in Pštrusa neighbourhood. During early morning of 11 February 1929, the temperature of -41,0 °C was recorded here. The record remains in place to this day. The temperature, however, was not the lowest in then-Czechoslovakia, beaten by 1,2 °C recorded in Litvínovice.

References

External links
 Statistical Office of the Slovak Republic

Villages and municipalities in Detva District